Nkwe may refer to:

Nkwe ya Gauta
Nkwe ya Selefera
Nkwe ya Boronse
Nkwe Medal
Enoch Nkwe, South African cricketer
George Nkwe, Cameroonian pastor
Malethola Maggie Nkwe, South African activist